Phire Ashar Gaan is an Indian Bengali music reality television show that aired on Star Jalsha. It is produced by Ekta Kapoor and Sougata Nandi under the banner Chayabani Balaji Entertainment.

Hosts 
 Sayani Ghosh
 Biswanath Basu

Judges 
 Amit Kumar
 Usha Uthup
 Bappi Lahiri

References

External links
 Phire Ashar Gaan Streaming On Hotstar

Balaji Telefilms television series
Television shows set in Kolkata
Bengali-language television programming in India
Television shows set in West Bengal
2016 Indian television series debuts